The women's 100 metres event at the 2005 Asian Athletics Championships was held in Incheon, South Korea on September 1–2.

Medalists

Results

Heats
Wind: Heat 1: +0.6 m/s, Heat 2: 0.0 m/s

Final
Wind: +0.3 m/s

References
Results

2005 Asian Athletics Championships
100 metres at the Asian Athletics Championships
2005 in women's athletics